The Audioframe is a digital audio workstation with sampler, hard disk recorder and digital mixer.

WaveFrame received a Technical Oscar in 2004 for digital audio workstations with editing capabilities applicable to movies.

References

Samplers (musical instrument)